Abdullah Al Mamun (13 July 1942 – 21 August 2008) was a Bangladeshi playwright, actor, and filmmaker. He earned the Bangla Academy Literary Award in 1978 and the Ekushey Padak in 2000 from the Government of Bangladesh. As a filmmaker, he won Bangladesh National Film Award for Best Director twice for the direction of the films Ekhoni Somoy (1980) and Dui Jibon (1988).

Early life and education
Mamun was born on 13 July 1942 in Jamalpur District. He completed his bachelor's and master's degrees in history from the University of Dhaka. He wrote in his memoirs Aamar Kotha, which was serially published in the fortnightly Tarokalok, "When I first got admitted in the Dhaka University, I turned to Najmul Huda Bacchu vai to get a chance in theatre. He took me to Natyaguru Nurul Momen. Hearing that besides acting, I write plays also, Momen Sir asked me, 'Have you read Bernard Shaw?' He cast me in his next play. That was my beginning. Since then I never had to look back". In 1950, he wrote his first stage play, Niyotir Parihas. Subsequently, under the guidance of Muneir Chowdhury, he further developed his skills as a playwright, director, and actor.

Career
Since 1965, Mamun was associated with Pakistan Television (PTV), later renamed Bangladesh Television (BTV). He wrote 25 dramas, seven novels, an autobiography titled Amar Ami, and a travelogue titled Manhattan. His literature mostly depicts the middle-class lifestyle of Bangladesh. His notable plays include Ekhono Kritadas, Tomrai, Amader Sontanera, Kokilara, Bibisab, Meraj Fakirer Maa, Mayik Master, Songsoptok, Pathar Somoy, Jibon Chhobi, and Baba. He was a founding member and playwright-director of the theatre troupe Theatre.

Mamun was also a filmmaker. He made his debut as a filmmaker with Angikar in 1972. His other notable films include Sareng Bou (1978), Ekhoni Somoy, Dui Jibon, Sokhi Tumi Kar, and Bihanga. He wrote stories and songs for films including "Oshikkhito". His last films, Doriya Parer Doulati and Dui Beayar Kirti, were released in 2010 and 2015 respectively.

Mamun joined BTV as a producer in 1966 and retired in 1991 as a director. He served director general of the National Institute of Mass Communication (NIMCO) and director general of Bangladesh Shilpakala Academy.

Health and death
Mamun was suffering from acute coronary syndrome along with diabetes, hypertension, and kidney and liver complexities. He died on 21 August 2008.

Works
Theatre plays

Films

Television plays

Awards
 Bangla Academy Literary Award (1978)
 Ekushey Padak (2000)
 Bangladesh Television Award
 Alakta Sahitya Purashkar
 Tarokalok Padak

References

External links
 

1942 births
2008 deaths
People from Jamalpur District
Bangladeshi dramatists and playwrights
Bangladeshi male novelists
University of Dhaka alumni
Recipients of the Ekushey Padak in arts
Recipients of Bangla Academy Award
Bangladeshi film directors
Bangladeshi male stage actors
Bangladeshi male television actors
Bangladeshi male film actors
Best Director National Film Award (Bangladesh) winners
20th-century novelists
20th-century dramatists and playwrights
20th-century male writers
Best Screenplay National Film Award (Bangladesh) winners
20th-century screenwriters